The German post offices abroad were a network of post offices in foreign countries established by Germany to provide mail service where the local services were deemed unsafe or unreliable. They were generally set up in cities with some sort of German commercial interest. In early use only the cancellation mark can identify their postal use abroad; such stamps are known as "Vorläufer" (forerunner) stamps. Later stamps are identified by overprints even when not postally used. German abroad stamps started appearing in the late 19th century and reached their heyday at the beginning of the 20th century; they closed down during or shortly after World War I.

It was not unusual for countries to maintain such offices and Austria-Hungary, China, France, Greece, Italy, Romania, Russia, the United Kingdom and the United States all did so. In the latter part of the 19th century and into the 20th century, having extraterritorial post offices was one indication of a nation's international power.

Stamps from German post offices abroad are popular with collectors and some are quite valuable. In a 2006 auction, a 40 Pfennig Germania hand-stamped "China" (Tientsin issue) stamp from 1900 realized 100,152 Euros.

German post offices in Morocco

German post offices in Morocco (German: Deutsche Post in Marokko) started to operate in 1899. German definitive stamps were used with overprints; after the first issue the value was changed to pesetas and centimos. German post offices closed in French-controlled Morocco in 1914, and in Spanish-controlled Morocco and Tangier in 1919.

Post offices existed in these towns (name per cancellation stamps):
International control:
Tanger
Spanish control
Alkassar
Arsila
Larache
Tetuan
French control:
Asimmur
Casablanca
Fez
Fez-Mellah
Marrakesch
Mazagan
Meknes
Mogador
Rabat
Saffi

See also
 German post offices abroad
 German post offices in China
 German post offices in the Ottoman Empire
 German post offices in Zanzibar
 List of postal services abroad

Notes

References 
 

Philately of Germany
Philately of Morocco

ru:Германская почта за границей